Robert Butler (8 March 1852 – 18 December 1916) was an English cricketer.  Butler was a right-handed batsman who occasionally fielded as a wicket-keeper.  He was born at Radcliffe-on-Trent, Nottinghamshire.

Butler made his first-class debut for Nottinghamshire against Kent at Crystal Palace Park in 1870.  He made would go on to make a further six first-class appearances for the county, the last of which came against Lancashire at Old Trafford in 1877. In his seven first-class appearances for Nottinghamshire, he scored 120 runs at an average of 10.00, with a high score of 60.  This score was his only half century and came against Kent on debut.  He also made two first-class appearances in the North v South fixture, for the North in 1872 and the South in 1876.  He also made a single first-class appearance for a United North of England Eleven against a United South of England Eleven in 1876 at Argyle Street, Hull.

He died at Sutton-cum-Granby, Nottinghamshire, on 18 December 1916.  His brother, Fred, and uncle, George Parr, both played first-class cricket.

References

External links
Robert Butler at ESPNcricinfo
Robert Butler at CricketArchive

1852 births
1916 deaths
People from Radcliffe-on-Trent
Cricketers from Nottinghamshire
English cricketers
Nottinghamshire cricketers
North v South cricketers
United North of England Eleven cricketers